Camilla Sköld Jansson (born 1957) is a Swedish Left Party politician. She was a member of the Riksdag from 1998 to 2006.

External links
Camilla Sköld Jansson at the Riksdag website

Members of the Riksdag from the Left Party (Sweden)
Living people
1957 births
Women members of the Riksdag
21st-century Swedish women politicians
Members of the Riksdag 2002–2006
Members of the Riksdag 1998–2002
20th-century Swedish women politicians
20th-century Swedish politicians